Insight Enterprises Inc. is an Arizona-based publicly traded global technology company that focuses on business-to-business and information technology (IT) capabilities for enterprises. Insight focuses on three, primary solution areas:  cloud and data center transformation, connected workforce, and digital innovation. The company is listed on the Fortune 500 and has offices in 19 countries.

History

Early years
Hard Drives International was founded in 1988 by Eric and Tim Crown. Initially a mail order business selling computer storage, the company expanded into a storefront when credit card companies wouldn't service startup mail order firms. In 1991, the company changed its name to Insight Enterprises, and  distribution included a full line of computers and accessories. The company held its initial public offering in January 1995.

Insight became an international company when it acquired TC Computers, based in Montreal, Canada, in 1997. In April 1998, Insight signed an agreement to acquire Choice Peripherals Ltd. and Plusnet Technologies Ltd., an Internet service provider and website hosting and development company operating as Force 9. The acquisition expanded Insight's operations to Europe.

2000-2010
Insight acquired Action Computer Supplies Holdings PLC, a U.K.-based direct marketer, in October 2001 for approximately $150 million in stock. In April 2002, the company acquired Comark for $150 million, increasing Insight's ability to work with clients of all sizes, including the public sector.

In July 2006, Insight entered an agreement to purchase Software Spectrum, a company that focused on software and mobility products for medium and large companies, from Level 3 Communications for $287 million.

Calence LLC, a technology company that focused on Cisco networking and advanced communications, was acquired by Insight in April 2008 for $125 million. Insight acquired U.K.-based Minx Ltd., a European network integrator with Cisco Gold Partner accreditation, in July 2008 for $1.5 million and the assumption of $4.6 million of existing debt.

During these years, there have been a number of companies founded by Insight employees, such as ComputerSupport.com.

2011-present
Ensynch, an information technology company founded in 2000, was acquired by Insight in September 2011. Insight acquired Inmac Gmbh, a business-to-business hardware reseller based in Germany, in February 2012.

In June 2015, Insight underwent a corporate rebranding which aimed to emphasize the company focus on customer relations and interaction. The company launched a new website in July 2015 as part of the shift in company focus. In October 2015, Insight acquired BlueMetal, an interactive design and technology architecture firm based in Boston. Also in 2015, Insight raised $200,000 in its annual campaign for its Noble Cause division. Through Noble Cause, Insight gives to local charities including the Make-a-Wish Foundation, the Boys & Girls Clubs of America and the Ronald McDonald House. In 2016, BlueMetal partnered with INDYCAR, the Indianapolis Motor Speedway and Microsoft to produce an analytics focused app during the Indianapolis 500. Insight opened an additional sales center at the Meadows Office and Technological Park in Conway, Arkansas in August 2016. Insight announced the acquisition of Ignia, an Australian-based business technology consulting company, in September 2016.

In November 2016, Insight Enterprises announced that they were acquiring the Eden Prairie, Minnesota-based data center services and solutions company, Datalink for $11.25 per share in cash, but that the company would remain mostly the same. The $258 million deal closed in the first quarter of 2017 and allowed Insight Enterprises to enhance its data center services.

In 2017, Insight announced the acquisition of Dutch cloud service provider Caase.com.

In August 2018, Insight announced the acquisition of Cardinal Solutions, a national provider of digital solutions across mobile, web, analytics and cloud.

In August 2019, Insight Enterprises announced the acquisition of PCM, Inc., a global provider of IT products and services, expanding Insight’s operations in the US, Canada and the UK.

Awards
2015
 HP PartnerOne Financial Services Partner of the Year
 Insight makes Fortune 500 list in 2015

2016
 Dell EMC Philanthropic Partner of the Year
 HP Personal Systems Reseller of the Year for the U.S. Channel
 Microsoft Australia Excellence in Industry and Platform Innovation
 Veritas Pacific Software Licensing Partner of the Year

2018
 Achievers 50 Most Engaged Workplaces in North America
 Fortune 100 Best Workplaces for Diversity
 Microsoft Singapore Modern Workplace Transformation Partner of the Year, and Security and Compliance Partner of the Year
 Microsoft U.S. Partner Award for Apps and Infrastructure – DevOps
 Microsoft U.S. Surface Fastest Growing Reseller
 Microsoft Worldwide Artificial Intelligence Partner of the Year
 Microsoft Worldwide Modern Desktop Partner of the Year
 Phoenix Business Journal Corporate Philanthropy Volunteerism Finalist

2019
 Australian IoT Best Primary Industry IoT Project

References

Companies based in Tempe, Arizona
Software companies based in Arizona
Multinational companies headquartered in the United States
Software companies of the United States
Software companies established in 1988
Companies listed on the Nasdaq
1995 initial public offerings